Zinc finger protein 532 is a protein that in humans is encoded by the ZNF532 gene.

References

Further reading